The Munich Cowboys are an American football team based in Munich, Germany. The club, together with the Düsseldorf Panther and the Ansbach Grizzlies, is one of the oldest in Germany. The team refers to itself as The Grand Old Team of the South.

The club has one national championship to its name, winning the German Bowl in 1993. As of 2015, the club has played more GFL games than any other team, 405, followed by the Berlin Adler with 378, one of only three other teams with more than 300 league games. The Cowboys have played 35 out of a possible 38 seasons at the highest level of the game in Germany, more than any other club.

History

American football in Munich dates back to 1975 when local football enthusiasts met with soldiers of the US Army to play the game. In 1979, the Munich Cowboys club was formed.

In 1979, the Cowboys became a founding member of the American Football Bundesliga, renamed the German Football League in 1999, together with the Frankfurter Löwen, Düsseldorf Panther, Ansbach Grizzlies, Berlin Bears and Bremerhaven Seahawks.

The Cowboys made their first appearance in the national championship game, the German Bowl, in 1992, but lost the game to the Düsseldorf Panther by a point.

The 1993 season saw the club's greatest success. It reached the German Bowl once more, this time against the Cologne Crocodiles. Playing at home in Munich, the Cowboys where 7–20 behind at half time but managed to equalise 29–29 at the end of regular time. The team then turned the game around and defeated the Crocodiles 42–36 to win their first, and as of 2019, only national championship.

After an era of lesser success, the team came close to reaching the German Bowl once more in 2000 and 2001 when, on both occasions, Munich lost to the Braunschweig Lions in the semi-finals.

After 22 consecutive seasons at the highest level of German football, the Bundesliga and, later, the GFL, the Cowboys withdrew to the tier-three Regionalliga Süd for the 2003 season. The clubs exile in the lower leagues was short-lived, winning promotion to the GFL 2 on first attempt and, from there, to the GFL in 2004. The team was however relegated from the GFL again in 2006.

Munich returned to the GFL in the 2008 season and came third in the southern division, losing once more to the Braunschweig Lions in the play-offs. The year 2009 was less successful and the Cowboys were almost relegated once more.

The team continued to be present in the GFL in 2010, where it was once more troubled by relegation fears but survived and will stay in the league for 2011. Phil Hickey, coach of the team and a member of the 1993 championship-winning side, is confident that he can take the Cowboys back to championship contention by 2012.

The club suffers from strong competition within the city from other sports, especially the association football clubs FC Bayern Munich and TSV 1860 Munich as well as the ice hockey team EHC München. Additionally, the ambitious basketball team of the FC Bayern Munich took over the clubs cheerleading team in 2009. The Cowboys, who attracted 1,100 spectators per game in 2009 suffered a 30 percent drop in attendance in 2010. In 2011, the Cowboys finished fourth in their division and qualified for the play-offs once more, where they were knocked out by the Kiel Baltic Hurricanes in the quarter finals. In 2012, the club came eighth in the southern division of the GFL, having to face GFL2 southern champions Allgäu Comets in the promotion-relegation play-off in which the Cowboys won both games and survived. The 2013 season saw a much improved performance with the team finishing third but being knocked out in the quarter finals of the play-offs by the Dresden Monarchs.

In the 2014 season the club finished fourth in the southern division of the GFL but lost 28–69 to the NewYorker Lions in the quarter finals of the play-offs. The following season they missed out on play-off qualification after finishing fifth.

The Munich Cowboys Ladies team has been quite successful in its recent past, reaching the Ladies Bowl on five occasions and winning it in 2005 and 2006.

Honours

Men
 German Bowl
 Champions: 1993
 Runners-up: 1992
 EFL
 Participations: 1994
 GFL
 Southern Division champions: (6) 1990, 1992, 1993, 1994, 2000, 2001
 Play-off qualification: (24) 1982–85, 1989–2001, 2008, 2011, 2013, 2014, 2018, 2021, 2022
 League membership: (40) 1979–2002, 2005–06, 2008–present
 GFL2
 Southern Division champions: 2004, 2007

Women
 Ladies Bowl
 Champions: 2005, 2006
 Runners-up: 2001, 2002, 2003

Juniors
 Junior Bowl
 Runners-up: 1986, 1987, 1996

German Bowl appearances
The club's appearances in the German Bowl:

Recent seasons
Recent seasons of the Munich Cowboys:

 PR = Promotion round.
 RR = Relegation round.
 QF = Quarter finals.

References

External links
  Official website
  German Football League official website
  American Football Verband Bayern website

American football teams in Germany
American football in Bavaria
American football teams established in 1979
Sport in Munich
German Football League teams
1979 establishments in West Germany